The Men's Giant Slalom competition in the 2016 FIS Alpine Skiing World Cup involved eleven events, including the first-ever parallel giant slalom (included in the giant slalom discipline standings) and the season finals in St. Moritz, Switzerland. The newly introduced Parallel Giant Slalom event at Alta Badia, Italy was a relatively short Giant Slalom course that pitted the men against one another in a modified bracket-reduction format from a field of thirty-two qualifying skiers, eventually whittled down to just four final-round racers in a "large final" (for the championship) and a "small final" (for third).

Defending discipline champion Marcel Hirscher of Austria and Alexis Pinturault of France each won four of the races this season and finished second in two others, After Pintauralt's fourth straight victory, in Kranjska Gora, he had closed his deficit to Hirscher to just 91 points with two races remaining.  However, Hirscher came back to win the giant slalom the next day on the same course, locking up the season championship with a 111-point lead over Pinturault with just one race remaining.  This was Hirscher's third title in this discipline on his way to his fifth straight overall World Cup championship.

Standings 
 

DNS = Did Not Start
DNF1 = Did Not Finish run 1
DSQ1 = Disqualified run 1
DNQ = Did Not Qualify for run 2
DNS2 = Finished run 1; Did Not Start run 2
DNF2 = Did Not Finish run 2
DSQ2 = Disqualified run 2

Updated at 21 March 2016 after all events.

See also
 2016 Alpine Skiing World Cup – Men's summary rankings
 2016 Alpine Skiing World Cup – Men's Overall
 2016 Alpine Skiing World Cup – Men's Downhill
 2016 Alpine Skiing World Cup – Men's Super-G
 2016 Alpine Skiing World Cup – Men's Slalom
 2016 Alpine Skiing World Cup – Men's Combined

References

External links
 Alpine Skiing at FIS website

Men's Giant Slalom
FIS Alpine Ski World Cup men's giant slalom discipline titles